Turbonilla multicostata is a species of sea snail, a marine gastropod mollusk in the family Pyramidellidae, the pyrams and their allies.

Description
The shell grows to a length of 4.2 mm.

Distribution
This species occurs in the following locations:
 Caribbean Sea (Jamaica; Yucatán, Mexico)
 Gulf of Mexico
 Atlantic Ocean : off North Carolina.

References

External links
 To Biodiversity Heritage Library (3 publications)
 To Encyclopedia of Life
 To ITIS
 To World Register of Marine Species

multicostata
Gastropods described in 1850